The Wright Model E was the first in the series of Wright Flyers that used a single propeller The aircraft was also the test demonstrator for the first automatic pilot control.

Design
The Model E featured 24 inch tires. It was flown with four and six cylinder Wright engines.

The model E was fitted with a prototype autopilot that used a wind driven generator and pendulums to drive the wing warping controls. The design was quickly eclipsed by a gyroscopic autopilot developed by Lawrence Sperry for the competing Curtiss Aeroplane Company.

Operational history
On 31 December 1913, Orville Wright demonstrated a Model E with an "automatic stabilizer" flying seven circuits around Huffman Prairie field with his hands above his head.
The Model E demonstrations earned the Wright Brothers the 1913 Collier Trophy from Aero Club of America.

Albert Elton (1881–1975) purchased the sole Wright Model E for exhibition flights.

Specifications (Wright Model E)

References

1910s United States sport aircraft
Model E
Biplanes
Aircraft first flown in 1913
Single-engined pusher aircraft